The 1st Special Squadron (January 1917 – October 1918) was an Imperial Japanese Navy fleet. In accordance with the Anglo-Japanese Alliance, the fleet helped defend Australia and New Zealand as well as Allied shipping in the Pacific and Indian oceans during World War I.

Background

Another light cruiser and three destroyers were under construction, and a small fleet of auxiliary ships was also being maintained.

After the Imperial German Navy's German East Asia Squadron was destroyed early in the war, most RAN ships were redeployed to the European theatres, leaving Australia and New Zealand exposed to German merchant raiders operating in the Pacific.  The Australian government requested help from the British Admiralty, as the remaining warships could not effectively protect the region. These requests suggested that ships of the United States Navy be deployed to supplement the forces in Australian waters, but instead, the Admiralty contacted Japan and made arrangements for several ships to be sent to Australia.

1st Special Squadron
In January 1917, Japan created the 1st Special Squadron, made up of several cruisers supported by the 2nd Destroyer Division. They were tasked to defend the Strait of Malacca and shipping from Australia to Aden. To provide more coverage, the Japanese Navy formed the 3rd Special Squadron on March 26, 1917, to defend the eastern coast of Australia and New Zealand. With the capture and sinking of German raiders, the pressure against Allied shipping lessened, and after December 1917, the 3rd Special Squadron was dissolved and the operational area of the 1st Special Squadron was enlarged to include the eastern coast of Australia and New Zealand. The defence of Australia, New Zealand and of Indian shipping lanes by Japanese ships continued until October 1918.

Ships of the 1st Special Squadron
Cruisers

2nd Destroyer Division

See also
 North American Task Force - Fleet assigned to patrol Canada and later the West Pacific
 Third Fleet (Imperial Japanese Navy) - Fleet assigned to patrol Russian coast during the Soviet Revolution
 2nd Special Squadron (Japanese Navy) - Fleet assigned to patrol Meditarean 
 2nd Fleet (Imperial Japanese Navy) was a fleet of the Imperial Japanese Navy (IJN) created as a mobile strike force in response to hostilities with Russia, and saw action in every IJN military operation until the end of World War II.
 1st Fleet (Imperial Japanese Navy)

Notes

Bibliography

Citations

References

 
 

World War I naval ships of Japan
Fleets of the Imperial Japanese Navy
Military units and formations established in 1917
Military units and formations disestablished in 1918